Čenta is a village located in the Zrenjanin municipality, in the Central Banat District of Serbia. It is situated in the Autonomous Province of Vojvodina. The village has a Serb ethnic majority (95.19%) and the population is 3,119 (2002 census).

Name

In Serbian, the village is known as Čenta (Чента), in Hungarian as Csenta, and in German as Tschenta.

Historical population

1961: 3,182
1971: 3,224
1981: 3,192
1991: 3,001
2002: 3,119

References
Slobodan Ćurčić, Broj stanovnika Vojvodine, Novi Sad, 1996.

See also
List of places in Serbia
List of cities, towns and villages in Vojvodina

Zrenjanin
Populated places in Serbian Banat